House of Love may refer to:

Albums
 House of Love (Amy Grant album), a 1994 Amy Grant album
 House of Love (Dottie West album), a 1974 album Dottie West album
 The House of Love (1988 album), the debut album by the aforementioned British rock band
 The House of Love (1990 album), the second album by the House of Love, usually referred to as Fontana
 The House of Love, the third album by the House of Love, usually referred to as Babe Rainbow

Songs
 "House of Love" (Amy Grant song), the title track from Amy Grant's 1994 House of Love album
 "House of Love" (East 17 song), a 1992 East 17 song
 House of Love (Mumbai), houses homeless children in Mumbai, India
 "House of Love" (RuPaul song), a 1993 RuPaul song
 "House of Love" (Smooth Touch song),
 "House of Love" (Vika and Linda song), a 1994 Vika and Linda song

Other
 The House of Love, an English rock band
 The House of Love (show), revue by Jayne Mansfield
 A Spy in the House of Love, a 1954 novel by the French novelist Anaïs Nin